Arlington is a city in Sibley County, Minnesota, United States. The population was 2,233 at the 2010 census.

History
The community was platted in 1856, and the name was officially approved on May 11, 1858, the same date that Minnesota became a state. German settlers came to the area to homestead beginning in the 1860s and 1870s. The population of Arlington continues to be of predominately German descent. In 1948, the community was incorporated as a city.

Geography

Demographics

2010 census
As of the census of 2010, there were 2,233 people, 911 households, and 549 families living in the city. The racial makeup of the city was 94.1% White, 0.1% African American, 0.1% Native American, 0.7% Asian, 3.6% from other races, and 1.4% from two or more races. Hispanic or Latino of any race were 9.4% of the population.

There were 911 households, of which 32.6% had children under the age of 18 living with them, 44.3% were married couples living together, 11.6% had a female householder with no husband present, 4.3% had a male householder with no wife present, and 39.7% were non-families. 34.4% of all households were made up of individuals, and 16.2% had someone living alone who was 65 years of age or older. The average household size was 2.38 and the average family size was 3.06.

The median age in the city was 35.6 years. 26.7% of residents were under the age of 18; 8% were between the ages of 18 and 24; 26.3% were from 25 to 44; 21.3% were from 45 to 64; and 17.6% were 65 years of age or older. The gender makeup of the city was 47.9% male and 52.1% female.

2000 census
As of the census of 2000, there were 2,048 people, 828 households, and 523 families living in the city. The racial makeup of the city was 95.02% White, 0.24% African American, 0.39% Asian, 3.91% from other races, and 0.44% from two or more races. Hispanic or Latino of any race were 6.05% of the population.

There were 828 households, out of which 31.4% had children under the age of 18 living with them, 51.8% were married couples living together, 7.9% had a female householder with no husband present, and 36.8% were non-families. 33.3% of all households were made up of individuals, and 19.1% had someone living alone who was 65 years of age or older.  The average household size was 2.39 and the average family size was 3.06.

In the city, the population was spread out, with 26.6% under the age of 18, 8.4% from 18 to 24, 27.1% from 25 to 44, 18.4% from 45 to 64, and 19.5% who were 65 years of age or older.  The median age was 36 years. For every 100 females, there were 88.8 males.  For every 100 females age 18 and over, there were 81.3 males.

The median income for a household in the city was $37,632, and the median income for a family was $49,231. Males had a median income of $31,603 versus $20,888 for females. The per capita income for the city was $18,458.  About 3.7% of families and 7.5% of the population were below the poverty line, including 5.0% of those under age 18 and 10.1% of those age 65 or over.

Education
Arlington is part of the Sibley East Public Schools district.  The local public high school is Sibley East High School.

St. Paul's Lutheran School is a Pre-K-8 grade school of the Wisconsin Evangelical Lutheran Synod in Arlington.

Infrastructure

Transportation
Minnesota State Highway 5 serves as a main route in the community.

TrailBlazer Transit serves Arlington and the surrounding area.

Notable people
John McGovern - Inducted into the College Football Hall of Fame in 1966.
August B. Mueller- Minnesota state legislator and farmer
Anne Panning - Co-directs the Brockport Writers Forum.
Thomas O. Streissguth - Minnesota Supreme Court justice.

References

External links
Arlington City Website
ePodunk: Profile for Arlington, Minnesota

Cities in Minnesota
Cities in Sibley County, Minnesota
1856 establishments in Minnesota Territory
Populated places established in 1856